or  is a Japanese game popular during the Meiji era that is also a form of divination, partially based on Western table-turning. The name kokkuri is an onomatopoeia meaning "to nod up and down", and refers to the movement of the actual kokkuri mechanism.  The kanji used to write the word is an ateji, although its characters reflect the popular belief that the movement of the mechanism is caused by supernatural agents (ko 狐, kitsune; ku 狗, dog/tengu; ri 狸, tanuki). The modern version is similar to a Oujia board.

Ancient kokkuri 
The word kokkuri refers to the game and physical apparatus, while kokkuri-san refers to the being that is summoned: it is considered by the Japanese to be some sort of animal spirit that is a mix between a fox, dog, and raccoon. These three animals are meant to reflect the dual nature of the being, justifying its different personality traits: the fox being a trickster or teacher, and the raccoon being both a bearer of mischief or good fortune. Kokkuri-san is believed to possess the apparatus in order to communicate with humans. The physical mechanism is composed of three bamboo rods arranged to make a tripod, upon which is placed a small pot lid or platter, which is covered by a cloth. In some versions, tags are inserted into each of the three rods, with the words kitsune, tengu, and tanuki, respectively; in others, the words are merely traced with a finger on the bottom of the plate. Three or more people will place both their hands upon the kokkuri (lined-up, as in table-turning) and ask the spirit a question, which that spirit will in theory answer by moving (or not moving) the legs underneath the plate.

Japanese folklorist Inoue Enryō wrote about the kokkuri phenomenon, denouncing it as mere superstition, yet his efforts did not succeed in de-popularizing the game.  Some scientific figures of the age attempted to explain the phenomena with the more scientific sounding yet ultimately equally mysterious term "human-electricity;" these same figures claimed the cloth used should always be of a white or gold color. Blue cloth was (incorrectly) said to hamper the human-electricity's passage. The human-electricity needing a passage, it was stated the game required participants to place both hands on the apparatus, with finger tips touching - as in Western table-turning.

The game is sometimes referred to as Okatabuki, Angel-san or Cupid-san.

Modern kokkuri 
Modern kokkuri has changed heavily from its original form, now resembling the much more common Oujia board, but played with a sheet of paper. A torii is drawn in the top-center of the paper, with the words 'Yes' and 'No' written on either side; a letter grid (most often hirigana) is placed underneath the torii, along with the numbers 0-9. A small coin (most commonly the ten yen) is used as a planchette.

Unlike the Western Ouija board, kokkuri has slight differences in playthrough. Before playing, a door or window must be propped open to allow the spirit to enter the room, and must be closed when the spirit leaves. In addition, sometime in the next 24 hours after the game is played, the paper must be burned and the coin spent in a financial transaction.

This modern version is sometimes referred to as Spirit of the Coin.

In popular culture
 In Gugure! Kokkuri-san, the three main yōkai characters are a fox spirit (kitsune), dog spirit (inugami), and tanuki spirit (bake-danuki).
In episode 5 of Nichijou, the character Yuuko Aioi goes to great lengths to explain the game to her classmate, Mio Naganohara, who then declines to play the game.
In Junji Ito's Souichi's Home Tutor, Souchi lists kokkuri as a personal hobby, but explains he doesn't need paper and simply asks a geisha doll questions instead.
The 1997 horror movie Kokkuri-san revolves around the playing of the game.

See also
 O-mikuji
 Ouija
 Fuji (planchette writing)
 Futomani
 Bunshinsaba
 Tengenjutsu (fortune telling)

References

Japanese folklore
Japanese games
Japanese urban legends
Urban legends
Supernatural legends